Over the Hills and Far Away is the first EP by Finnish symphonic metal band Nightwish, released on 25 June 2001 through Spinefarm Records in Finland, and Drakkar Records in the rest of Europe. It was also released by Toy's Factory in Japan and Century Media Records in the US. Bassist Sami Vänskä left the band after its recording, due to musical differences between him and Tuomas Holopainen. He was replaced by the bassist and male vocalist, Marko Hietala.

The editions by Drakkar and Century Media contain different live tracks taken from the live DVD From Wishes to Eternity, recorded in Tampere, Finland, on 29 December 2000.

The EP debuted at number one on the Finnish Singles Chart and spent twelve weeks in the top three, topping it for another four weeks and spending six weeks at number two. It charted for a total of 49 weeks, including two weeks in early 2004. The EP has been awarded double-platinum certification in Finland and has sold over 36,000 copies to date, becoming the sixth-best-selling single of all time in Finland. Over the Hills and Far Away entered also the European charts, in the Top 100 of Germany, Austria, France and Switzerland.

The EP has two new songs and a remake of Angels Fall First's "Astral Romance", sung by Tony Kakko beside Tarja Turunen. The title song is by Northern Irish singer and guitarist Gary Moore, and has backing vocals by Tuomas Holopainen and Kakko. "It had a bit of a karaoke vibe because the backing track was so similar," Moore observed. "I don't mean that insultingly, but it was almost identical. I believe they're a pretty big band now, so it's cool that they did it." Tapio Wilska sings on "10th Man Down".

Track listing

Personnel
Credits for Over the Hills and Far Away adapted from liner notes.

Nightwish
Tarja Turunen – vocals
Tuomas Holopainen – keyboards, backing vocals on "Over the Hills and Far Away", mixing
Emppu Vuorinen – guitars
Sami Vänskä – bass guitar, cover photo
Jukka Nevalainen – drums

Additional musicians
Tapio Wilska – vocals on "10th Man Down"
Tony Kakko – vocals on "Astral Romance", backing vocals on "Over the Hills and Far Away"

Production
Tero Kinnunen – producer, mixing, recording
Mikko Karmila – recording, mixing
Mika Jussila – mastering

Charts

Certifications

See also
List of best-selling singles in Finland

References

External links
Nightwish's Official Website

Nightwish albums
2001 debut EPs
Spinefarm Records EPs
Century Media Records albums